Eucalyptus infera, commonly known as the Durikai mallee, is a species of mallee, rarely a small tree, that is endemic to Queensland. It has smooth grey bark, broadly lance-shaped to egg-shaped leaves, flower buds in groups of between nine and eighteen, white flowers and hemispherical fruit.

Description
It has smooth, shiny, grey to copper-coloured bark. Flowering occurs between September and November and the flowers are white.

Taxonomy and naming
Eucalyptus infera was first formally described in 1990 by Anthony Bean and the description was published in the journal Austrobaileya from a specimen collected in the Durikai State Forest near Warwick in 1988. The specific epithet (infera) is a Latin word meaning "lower" or "inferior", referring to this species usually being in the understorey of taller eucalypts.

Distribution and habitat
Durikai mallee grows in or near temporary watercourses as a component of open forest and is only known from Herries Range south-west of Warwick.

Conservation status
This mallee is listed as vulnerable under the Australian Government Environment Protection and Biodiversity Conservation Act 1999 and the Queensland Government Nature Conservation Act 1992. The main threat to the species is habitat loss due to land clearing.

See also
List of Eucalyptus species

References

infera
Myrtales of Australia
Flora of Queensland
Plants described in 1990
Taxa named by Anthony Bean